Meulan-en-Yvelines (formerly just Meulan) is a commune in the Yvelines department in the Île-de-France region in north-central France. It hosted part of the sailing events for the 1900 Summer Olympics held in neighbouring Paris, and would do so again 24 years later.

History
In 1435, as a part of the Hundred Years' War, Ambroise de Loré and Jean de Dunois defeated the English nearby.

Meulan hosted the first regatta in the sailing event at the 1900 Summer Olympics.

Population

Heraldry 
The coat of arms of Meulan-en-Yvelines is blazoned as:

Azure semy-de-lys or, a chief chequy or and gules of four tiers.

The shield of arms is composed of the ancient arms of France, granted to the village as an augmentation of honour by Henri IV in 1590, with a chief displaying the first four tiers of the chequy or and gules arms of the ancient Counts of Meulan.

Notable people
Abdoulaye Doucouré (born 1993), footballer
David Douillet (born 1969), judoka

Frederic Esther (born 1972), boxer
Elie Konki (born 1992), boxer
Ferland Mendy (born 1995), footballer
Kevin Mendy (born 1992), basketball player
M'Baye Niang (born 1994), footballer
Ibrahim Sacko (born 1993), footballer
Maurice Thiriet (1906–1972), composer 
Yannick Zachee (born 1986), basketball player

Twin towns – sister cities
Meulan is twinned with:
 Arraiolos, Portugal
 Kilsyth, Scotland, United Kingdom
 Taufkirchen, Germany

See also
Aubette de Meulan
Communes of the Yvelines department

References

Sports-reference.com Summer Olympics Paris 20 May 1900 sailing mixed open results. Retrieved 14 November 2010.
1924 Olympics official report. pp. 582–3. 

Venues of the 1900 Summer Olympics
Venues of the 1924 Summer Olympics
Olympic sailing venues
Communes of Yvelines